The International Style or internationalism is a major architectural style that was developed in the 1920s and 1930s and was closely related to modernism and modernist architecture. It was first defined by Museum of Modern Art curators Henry-Russell Hitchcock and Philip Johnson in 1932, based on works of architecture from the 1920s. The terms rationalist architecture and modern movement  are often used interchangeably with International Style, although the former is mostly used in the English-speaking world to specifically refer to the Italian rationalism, or even the International Style that developed in Europe as a whole.

It is defined by the Getty Research Institute as "the style of architecture that emerged in Holland, France, and Germany after World War I and spread throughout the world, becoming the dominant architectural style until the 1970s. The style is characterized by an emphasis on volume over mass, the use of lightweight, mass-produced, industrial materials, rejection of all ornament and colour, repetitive modular forms, and the use of flat surfaces, typically alternating with areas of glass."

Background
Around the start of the 20th century, a number of architects around the world began developing new architectural solutions to integrate traditional precedents with new social demands and technological possibilities. The work of Victor Horta and Henry van de Velde in Brussels, Antoni Gaudí in Barcelona, Otto Wagner in Vienna and Charles Rennie Mackintosh in Glasgow, among many others, can be seen as a common struggle between old and new. These architects were not considered part of the International Style because they practiced in an "individualistic manner" and seen as the last representatives of Romanticism.

The International Style can be traced to buildings designed by a small group of modernists, the major figures of which include Ludwig Mies van der Rohe, Jacobus Oud, Le Corbusier, Richard Neutra and Philip Johnson.

The founder of the Bauhaus school, Walter Gropius, along with prominent Bauhaus instructor, Ludwig Mies van der Rohe, became known for steel frame structures employing glass curtain walls.  One of the world's earliest modern buildings where this can be seen is a shoe factory designed by Gropius in 1911 in Alfeld, Germany, called the Fagus Works building. The first building, built entirely on Bauhaus design principles, was the concrete and steel Haus am Horn, built in 1923 in Weimar, Germany, designed by Georg Muche. The Gropius designed Bauhaus school building in Dessau, built 1925–26 and the Harvard Graduate Center (Cambridge, Massachusetts; 1949–50) also known as the Gropius Complex, exhibit clean lines and a "concern for uncluttered interior spaces".

Marcel Breuer, a recognized leader in Béton Brut (Brutalist) architecture and notable alumni of the Bauhaus, who also pioneered the use of plywood and tubular steel in furniture design, and who after leaving the Bauhaus would later teach alongside Gropius at Harvard, is as well an important contributor to Modernism and the International Style.

Prior to use of the term 'International Style', some American architects—such as Louis Sullivan, Frank Lloyd Wright, and Irving Gill—exemplified qualities of simplification, honesty and clarity.
Frank Lloyd Wright's Wasmuth Portfolio had been exhibited in Europe and influenced the work of European modernists, and his travels there probably influenced his own work, although he refused to be categorized with them. His buildings of the 1920s and 1930s clearly showed a change in the style of the architect, but in a different direction than the International Style.

In Europe the modern movement in architecture had been called Functionalism or Neue Sachlichkeit (New Objectivity), L'Esprit Nouveau, or simply Modernism and was very much concerned with the coming together of a new architectural form and social reform, creating a more open and transparent society.

The "International Style", as defined by Hitchcock and Johnson, had developed in 1920s Western Europe, shaped by the activities of the Dutch De Stijl movement, Le Corbusier, and the Deutscher Werkbund and the Bauhaus. Le Corbusier had embraced Taylorist and Fordist strategies adopted from American industrial models in order to reorganize society. He contributed to a new journal called L'Esprit Nouveau that advocated the use of modern industrial techniques and strategies to create a higher standard of living on all socio-economic levels. In 1927, one of the first and most defining manifestations of the International Style was the Weissenhof Estate in Stuttgart, overseen by Ludwig Mies van der Rohe. It was enormously popular, with thousands of daily visitors.

1932 MoMA exhibition

The exhibition Modern Architecture: International Exhibition ran from February 9 to March 23, 1932, at the Museum of Modern Art (MoMA), in the Heckscher Building at Fifth Avenue and 56th Street in New York. Beyond a foyer and office, the exhibition was divided into six rooms: the "Modern Architects" section began in the entrance room, featuring a model of William Lescaze's Chrystie-Forsyth Street Housing Development in New York. From there visitors moved to the centrally placed Room A, featuring a model of a mid-rise housing development for Evanston, Illinois, by Chicago architect brothers Monroe Bengt Bowman and Irving Bowman, as well as a model and photos of Walter Gropius's Bauhaus building in Dessau.  In the largest exhibition space, Room C, were works by Le Corbusier, Ludwig Mies van der Rohe, J. J. P. Oud and Frank Lloyd Wright (including a project for a house on the Mesa in Denver, 1932). Room B was a section titled "Housing", presenting "the need for a new domestic environment" as it had been identified by historian and critic Lewis Mumford.  In Room D were works by Raymond Hood (including "Apartment Tower in the Country" and the McGraw-Hill Building) and Richard Neutra.  In Room E was a section titled "The extent of modern architecture", added at the last minute, which included the works of thirty seven modern architects from fifteen countries who were said to be influenced by the works of Europeans of the 1920s. Among these works was shown Alvar Aalto's Turun Sanomat newspaper offices building in Turku, Finland.

After a six-week run in New York City, the exhibition then toured the US – the first such "traveling-exhibition" of architecture in the US – for six years.

Curators
MoMA director Alfred H. Barr hired architectural historian and critic Henry-Russell Hitchcock and Philip Johnson to curate the museum's first architectural exhibition. The three of them toured Europe together in 1929. The three of them also discussed Hitchcock's book about modern art. By December 1930, the first written proposal for an exhibition of the "new architecture" was set down, yet the first draft of the book was not complete until some months later.

Publications
The 1932 exhibition led to two publications by Hitchcock and Johnson:
 The exhibition catalog, "Modern Architecture: International Exhibition"
 The book, The International Style: Architecture Since 1922, published by W. W. Norton & Co. in 1932.
reprinted in 1997 by W. W. Norton & Company

Previous to the 1932 exhibition and book, Hitchcock had concerned himself with the themes of modern architecture in his 1929 book Modern Architecture: Romanticism and Reintegration.

According to Terence Riley: "Ironically the (exhibition) catalogue, and to some extent, the book The International Style, published at the same time of the exhibition, have supplanted the actual historical event."

Definition
Hitchcock and Johnson's exhibition catalog identified three principles of the style: volume of space (as opposed to mass and solidity), regularity, and flexibility.

Hitchcock and Johnson identified three principles: the expression of volume rather than mass, the emphasis on balance rather than preconceived symmetry, and the expulsion of applied ornament.

Common characteristics of the International Style include: a radical simplification of form, a rejection of ornament, and adoption of glass, steel and concrete as preferred materials. Further, the transparency of buildings, construction (called the honest expression of structure), and acceptance of industrialized mass-production techniques contributed to the international style's design philosophy. Finally, the machine aesthetic, and logical design decisions leading to support building function were used by the International architect to create buildings reaching beyond historicism. The ideals of the style are commonly summed up in three slogans: ornament is a crime, truth to materials, form follows function; and Le Corbusier's description: "A house is a machine to live in".

The following architects and buildings were selected by Hitchcock and Johnson for display at the exhibition Modern Architecture: International Exhibition:

Notable omissions
The exhibition excluded other contemporary styles that were exploring the boundaries of architecture at the time, including: Art Deco; German Expressionism, for instance the works of Hermann Finsterlin; and the organicist movement, popularized in the work of Antoni Gaudí. As a result of the 1932 exhibition, the principles of the International Style were endorsed, while other styles were classed less significant.

In 1922, the competition for the Tribune Tower and its famous  second-place entry by Eliel Saarinen gave some indication of what was to come, though these works would not have been accepted by Hitchcock and Johnson as representing the "International Style". Similarly, Johnson, writing about Joseph Urban's recently completed New School for Social Research in New York, stated: "In the New School we have an anomaly of a building supposed to be in a style of architecture based on the development of the plan from function and facade from plan but which is a formally and pretentiously conceived as a Renaissance palace. Urban's admiration for the New Style is more complete than his understanding."

California architect Rudolph Schindler's work was not a part of the exhibit, though Schindler had pleaded with Hitchcock and Johnson to be included. Then, "[f]or more than 20 years, Schindler had intermittently launched a series of spirited, cantankerous exchanges with the museum."

Before 1932

1932–1944

The gradual rise of the Nazi regime in Weimar Germany in the 1930s, and the Nazis' rejection of modern architecture, meant that an entire generation of avant-gardist architects, many of them Jews, were forced out of continental Europe. Some, such as Mendelsohn, found shelter in England, while a considerable number of the Jewish architects made their way to Palestine, and others to the USA. However, American anti-Communist politics after the war and Philip Johnson's influential rejection of functionalism have tended to mask the fact that many of the important architects, including contributors to the original Weissenhof project, fled to the Soviet Union. This group also tended to be far more concerned with functionalism and its social agenda. Bruno Taut, Mart Stam, the second Bauhaus director Hannes Meyer, Ernst May and other important figures of the International Style went to the Soviet Union in 1930 to undertake huge, ambitious, idealistic urban planning projects, building entire cities from scratch. In 1936, when Stalin ordered them out of the country, many of these architects became stateless and sought refuge elsewhere; for example, Ernst May moved to Kenya.

The White City of Tel Aviv is a collection of over 4,000 buildings built in the International Style in the 1930s. Many Jewish architects who had studied at the German Bauhaus school designed significant buildings here. A large proportion of the buildings built in the International Style can be found in the area planned by Patrick Geddes, north of Tel Aviv's main historical commercial center. In 1994, UNESCO proclaimed the White City a World Heritage Site, describing the city as "a synthesis of outstanding significance of the various trends of the Modern Movement in architecture and town planning in the early part of the 20th century". In 1996, Tel Aviv's White City was listed as a World Monuments Fund endangered site.

The residential area of Södra Ängby in western Stockholm, Sweden, blended an international or functionalist style with garden city ideals. Encompassing more than 500 buildings, most of them designed by Edvin Engström, it remains the largest coherent functionalist or "International Style" villa area in Sweden and possibly the world, still well-preserved more than a half-century after its construction in 1933–40 and protected as a national cultural heritage.

Zlín is a city in the Czech Republic which was in the 1930s completely reconstructed on principles of functionalism. In that time the city was a headquarters of Bata Shoes company and Tomáš Baťa initiated a complex reconstruction of the city which was inspired by functionalism and the Garden city movement. Tomas Bata Memorial is the most valuable monument of the Zlín functionalism. It is a modern paraphrase of the constructions of high gothic style period: the supporting system and colourful stained glass and the reinforced concrete skeleton and glass.

With the rise of Nazism, a number of key European modern architects fled to the USA. When Walter Gropius and Marcel Breuer fled Germany they both arrived at the Harvard Graduate School of Design, in an excellent position to extend their influence and promote the Bauhaus as the primary source of architectural modernism. When Mies fled in 1938, he first fled to England, but on emigrating to the USA he went to Chicago, founded the Second School of Chicago at IIT and solidified his reputation as a prototypical modern architect.

1945–present

After World War II, the International Style matured; Hellmuth, Obata & Kassabaum (later renamed HOK) and Skidmore, Owings & Merrill (SOM) perfected the corporate practice, and it became the dominant approach for decades in the US and Canada. Beginning with the initial technical and formal inventions of 860-880 Lake Shore Drive Apartments in Chicago its most famous examples include the United Nations headquarters, the Lever House, the Seagram Building in New York City, and the campus of the United States Air Force Academy in Colorado Springs, Colorado, as well as the Toronto-Dominion Centre in Toronto. Further examples can be found in mid-century institutional buildings throughout North America and the "corporate architecture" spread from there, especially to Europe.

In Canada, this period coincided with a major building boom and few restrictions on massive building projects. International Style skyscrapers came to dominate many of Canada's major cities, especially Ottawa, Montreal, Vancouver, Calgary, Edmonton, Hamilton, and Toronto. While these glass boxes were at first unique and interesting, the idea was soon repeated to the point of ubiquity. A typical example is the development of so-called Place de Ville, a conglomeration of three glass skyscrapers in downtown Ottawa, where the plans of the property developer Robert Campeau in the mid 1960s and early 1970s—in the words of historian Robert W. Collier, "forceful and abrasive, he was not well-loved at City Hall"—had no regard for existing city plans, "built with contempt for the existing city and for city responsibilities in the key areas of transportation and land use". Architects attempted to put new twists into such towers, such as the Toronto City Hall by Finnish architect Viljo Revell. By the late 1970s a backlash was under way against modernism—prominent anti-modernists such as Jane Jacobs and George Baird were partly based in Toronto.

The typical International Style or "corporate architecture" high-rise usually consists of the following:
 Square or rectangular footprint
 Simple cubic "extruded rectangle" form
 Windows running in broken horizontal rows forming a grid
 All facade angles are 90 degrees.

In 2000 UNESCO proclaimed Ciudad Universitaria de Caracas in Caracas, Venezuela, as a World Heritage Site, describing it as "a masterpiece of modern city planning, architecture and art, created by the Venezuelan architect Carlos Raúl Villanueva and a group of distinguished avant-garde artists".

In June 2007 UNESCO proclaimed Ciudad Universitaria of the Universidad Nacional Autónoma de México (UNAM), in Mexico City, a World Heritage Site due to its relevance and contribution in terms of international style movement. It was designed in the late 1940s and built in the mid-1950s based upon a masterplan created by architect Enrique del Moral. His original idea was enriched by other students, teachers, and diverse professionals of several disciplines. The university houses murals by Diego Rivera, Juan O'Gorman and others. The university also features Olympic Stadium (1968). In his first years of practice, Pritzker Prize winner and Mexican architect Luis Barragán designed buildings in the International Style. But later he evolved to a more traditional local architecture. Other notable Mexican architects of the International Style or modern period are Carlos Obregón Santacilia, Augusto H. Alvarez, Mario Pani, Vladimir Kaspé, Enrique del Moral, Juan Sordo Madaleno, Max Cetto, among many others.

In Brazil Oscar Niemeyer proposed a more organic and sensual International Style. He designed the political landmarks (headquarters of the three state powers) of the new, planned capital Brasilia. The masterplan for the city was proposed by Lucio Costa.

Criticism
In 1930, Frank Lloyd Wright wrote: "Human houses should not be like boxes, blazing in the sun, nor should we outrage the Machine by trying to make dwelling-places too complementary to Machinery."

In Elizabeth Gordon's well-known 1953 essay, "The Threat to the Next America," she criticized the style as non-practical, citing many instances where "glass houses" are too hot in summer and too cold in winter, empty, take away private space, lack beauty and generally are not livable. Moreover, she accused this style's proponents of taking away a sense of beauty from people and thus covertly pushing for a totalitarian society.

In 1966, architect Robert Venturi published Complexity and Contradiction in Architecture, essentially a book-length critique of the International Style. Architectural historian Vincent Scully regarded Venturi's book as 'probably the most important writing on the making of architecture since Le Corbusier's Vers une Architecture. It helped to define postmodernism.

Best-selling American author Tom Wolfe wrote a book-length critique, From Bauhaus to Our House, portraying the style as elitist.

One of the supposed strengths of the International Style has been said to be that the design solutions were indifferent to location, site, and climate; the solutions were supposed to be universally applicable; the style made no reference to local history or national vernacular. This was soon identified as one of the style's primary weaknesses.

In 2006, Hugh Pearman, the British architectural critic of The Times, observed that those using the style today are simply "another species of revivalist", noting the irony. The negative reaction to internationalist modernism has been linked to public antipathy to overall development.

In the preface to the fourth edition of his book Modern Architecture: A Critical History (2007), Kenneth Frampton argued that there had been a "disturbing Eurocentric bias" in histories of modern architecture. This "Eurocentrism" included the USA.

Architects

 Alvar Aalto
 Max Abramovitz
 Luis Barragán
 Welton Becket
 Pietro Belluschi
 Geoffrey Bazeley
 Max Bill
 Marcel Breuer
 Roberto Burle Marx
 Gordon Bunshaft
 Natalie de Blois
 Henry N. Cobb
 George Dahl
 Sir Frederick Gibberd
 Charles and Ray Eames
 Otto Eisler
 Joseph Emberton
 Bohuslav Fuchs
 Heydar Ghiai
 Landis Gores
 Bruce Graham
 Eileen Gray
 Walter Gropius
 Otto Haesler
 Arieh El-Hanani
 Wallace Harrison
 Hermann Henselmann
 Raymond Hood
 George Howe
 Muzharul Islam
 Arne Jacobsen
 Marcel Janco
 John M. Johansen
 Philip Johnson
 Roger Johnson
 Louis Kahn
 Dov Karmi
 Oskar Kaufmann
 Richard Kauffmann
 Fazlur Khan
 Frederick John Kiesler
 Le Corbusier
 William Lescaze
 Charles Luckman
 Yehuda Magidovitch
 Michael Manser
 Alfred Mansfeld
 Erich Mendelsohn
 John O. Merrill
 Hannes Meyer
 Ludwig Mies van der Rohe
 Richard Neutra
 Oscar Niemeyer
 Eliot Noyes
 Gyo Obata
 Jacobus Oud
 Nathaniel A. Owings
 Mario Pani
 I. M. Pei
 Frits Peutz
 Ernst Plischke
 Ralph Rapson
 Zeev Rechter
 Viljo Revell
 Gerrit Rietveld
 Carl Rubin
 Eero Saarinen
 Rudolph Schindler
 Michael Scott
 Arieh Sharon
 Louis Skidmore
 Ben-Ami Shulman
 Jerzy Sołtan
 Raphael Soriano
 Edward Durell Stone
 Carlos Raúl Villanueva
 Leendert van der Vlugt
 Munio Weinraub
 Lloyd Wright
 Minoru Yamasaki
 The Architects Collaborative
 Toyo Ito

See also
 Critical regionalism
 Expressionist architecture
 Functionalism (architecture)
 High-tech architecture
 Modern architecture
 Northwest Regional style
 Organic architecture

References

Further reading
 Boness, Stefan. Tel Aviv: The White City, Jovis, Berlin 2012, 
 Elderfield, John (ed.). Philip Johnson and the Museum of Modern Art, Museum of Modern Art, New York, 1998
 Gössel, Gabriel. Functional Architecture. Funktionale Architektur. Le Style International. 1925–1940, Taschen, Berlin, 1990
 Riley, Terence. The International Style: Exhibition 15 and The Museum of Modern Art, Rizzoli, New York, 1992
 Tabibi, Baharak Exhibitions as the Medium of Architectural Reproduction – "Modern Architecture: International Exhibition", Department of Architecture, Middle East Technical University, 2005]

External links

 "How Chicago Sparked the International Style of Architecture in America", Architectural Digest

 
 I
20th-century architectural styles
Architectural design
International Exhibition of Modern Architecture